The 1998–99 U.C. Sampdoria season ended with the club's relegation to Serie B just eight years after winning the Serie A title in 1990–91. Similarly to Napoli the year prior, the club was no longer a financial power when it came to signing players, while its high-profile signing, Ariel Ortega, did not deliver to the degree Sampdoria had hoped for.

Squad

Goalkeepers
  Fabrizio Ferron
  Luca Fuselli
  Marco Ambrosio

Defenders
  Marcello Castellini
  Stefano Nava
  Moreno Mannini
  David Balleri
  Hugo
  Alessandro Grandoni
  Saliou Lassissi
  Nenad Sakić

Midfielders
  Marco Franceschetti
  Fabio Pecchia
  Pierre Laigle
  Bratislav Živković
  Marco Sgrò
  Simone Vergassola
  Vincenzo Iacopino
  Matteo Solari
  Lee Sharpe
  Doriva

Attackers
  Vincenzo Montella
  Ariel Ortega
  Francesco Palmieri
  Catê
  Zoran Jovičić
  Simone Aloe

Transfers

In 
24.  Saliou Lassissi, on loan from Parma
07.  Fabio Pecchia, from Juventus
31.  Lee Sharpe, on loan from Bradford City
32.  Doriva, from Porto
10.  Ariel Ortega, from Valencia

Out 
7.   Juan Sebastián Verón to Parma F.C.
10.   Alain Boghossian to Parma F.C.
6.   Siniša Mihajlović to S.S. Lazio
21.   Giuseppe Signori to Bologna F.C.
24.  Mattia Biso
16.  Gastón Córdoba, to Colón
24.  Oumar Dieng, to Auxerre
27.  Fabrizio Ficini, on loan to Fiorentina

Winter
27.  Paco Soares, on loan to Empoli
07.  Emanuele Pesaresi, on loan to Napoli

Competitions

Serie A

League table

Results by round

Matches

Topscorers

  Vincenzo Montella – 12
  Ariel Ortega – 8
  Francesco Palmieri – 7

UEFA Intertoto cup

Second round

Third round

Fourth round

Statistics

Players statistics

References

U.C. Sampdoria seasons
Sampdoria